Grady is an American sitcom and a spin-off of Sanford and Son that aired on NBC from December 4, 1975 to March 11, 1976. Whitman Mayo reprises his role as Fred Sanford's widower friend Grady, who leaves Watts to move in with his daughter and her family in Westwood. Executive producer Norman Lear served as a consultant to the show.

The series never found a solid audience, and was canceled after just ten episodes. Whitman Mayo returned to Sanford and Son and would go on to star in the spinoff series Sanford Arms.

Cast
Whitman Mayo as Grady Wilson
Carole Cole as Ellie Wilson Marshall, Grady's daughter
Joe Morton as Hal Marshall, Grady's son-in-law
Rosanne Katon as Laurie Marshall, Grady's granddaughter
Haywood Nelson as Haywood Marshall, Grady's grandson
Jack Fletcher as Mr. Pratt

Redd Foxx made a special guest appearance as Fred Sanford in the first episode.

Episodes

Broadcast
The pilot episode was repackaged as an episode of Sanford and Son and is a part of its syndication package. An episode of this series aired on TV Land during a Norman Lear tribute in 2003. As of 2021, the series is streaming on Sony Crackle and Tubi TV.

Home media
On July 12, 2016, Sony Pictures Entertainment released The Best of Grady on DVD in Region 1 as a manufacture on demand release. It has every episode excluding episode #3 "Merry Birthday, Happy Christmas".

References

External links

Grady at TVGuide.com

1970s American sitcoms
1970s American black sitcoms
NBC original programming
Television series about families
Television series by Sony Pictures Television
Television shows set in Los Angeles
American television spin-offs
Sanford & Son spin-offs
1975 American television series debuts
1976 American television series endings